William Connor Hennessy ( - November 2, 2001) was an American civil servant and political figure. From 1982 to 1984, Hennessy served as chairman of the New York Democratic Party.

Career 
Hennessy worked at the New York State Department of Transportation for several decades, with his first position being a chainman in 1946. Governor Carey appointed Hennessy as Transportation Commissioner in 1977.

In July 1987, Hennessy was appointed chairman of the New York State Thruway. He resigned the position in 1988. 

Governor Mario Cuomo chose Hennessy as chairman of the state Democratic Party in 1982. As chairman, Hennessy improved the party's finances. He resigned in 1984, citing health reasons.

Personal life 
Hennessy married Corrinne Schwalb in 1951.

References

New York (state) Democrats
2001 deaths